Samuel W. Randolph was a member of the Wisconsin State Senate.

Biography
Randolph was born on December 5, 1872 in Manitowoc, Wisconsin. For many years he was interested in navigation of the Great Lakes and represented several transportation companies. He was appointed as a Harbor Master in January 1902, to fill the unexpired term and reappointed for a full term in April, 1902.

He died in 1941, and is buried in Evergreen Cemetery, in Manitowoc.

Political career
Randolph was a member of the Senate from 1903 to 1914. He was a Democrat.

References

People from Manitowoc, Wisconsin
Democratic Party Wisconsin state senators
1872 births
1941 deaths
Burials in Wisconsin